The 2022–23 FIS Ski Jumping World Cup is the 44th World Cup season in ski jumping for men, the 26th official World Cup season in ski flying, and the 12th World Cup season for women. The men's season started in November in Wisła, Poland and will conclude in April in Planica, Slovenia. The women's season started also in Wisła and will conclude in March in Lahti, Finland.

Ryōyū Kobayashi from Japan and Marita Kramer from Austria are the defending overall champions from the 2021–22 season.

For the first time since this season (both in summer and winter), the “Super Team” is taking place – a duo competition. It will consist of three competitions in which each nation can enter only one team. All submitted duos will take part in the first round, twelve teams will advance to the second round, and the eight best teams after two series will be shown in the final.

This season is planned to be the longest in history. For the first time the competition started so early (5th November), which was the first time in World Cup history on ice track and plastic surface and will end so late (2nd April).

The FIS Sub-Committee voted in favor of allowing the women to ski fly on the Ski Flying hill in Vikersund this winter.
The women's premiere won't be a World Cup competition, because the number of participants will be limited compared to a World Cup event. The 15 best athletes of the Raw Air overall ranking will be allowed to ski fly on the Vikersundbakken in Vikersund in the final event of the Raw Air 2023. The minimum age of the athletes will be 18.

Map of world cup hosts 
All 24 locations hosting world cup events for men (19), for women (13) and shared (8) in this season.

Men 
World Cup history in real time

after FH event in Vikersund (18 March 2023)

Calendar

Men's team 
World Cup history in real time

after LH event in Planica (4 March 2023)

Men's super team 
World Cup history in real time

after LH event in Râșnov (19 February 2023)

Standings

Overall

Nations Cup

Prize money

Ski Flying

Four Hills Tournament

Raw Air

Planica7

Women 
World Cup history in real time

after LH event in Lillehammer (15 March 2023)

Calendar

Women's team 
World Cup history in real time

after NH event in Hinzenbach (25 February 2022)

Women's super team 
World Cup history in real time

after NH event in Zaō (14 January 2023)

Standings

Overall

Nations Cup

Prize money

Silvester Tournament

Raw Air

Mixed team 
World Cup history in real time

after LH event in Willingen (3 February 2023)

Podium table by nation 
Table showing the World Cup podium places (gold–1st place, silver–2nd place, bronze–3rd place) by the countries represented by the athletes.

Points distribution 
The table shows the number of points won in the 2022/23 FIS Ski Jumping World Cup for men and women.

Qualifications 
In case the number of participating athletes is 50 (men) / 40 (women) or lower, a Prologue competition round must be organized. In the Women's Silvester Tournament qualifies 50 jumpers.

Men

Women

Prize money distribution 
Total prize money for single World Cup event is 79,100 CHF for men and 28,120 CHF for women. Men's qualification winners also get extra 3,200 CHF on no and large hills and 5,000 CHF on ski flying hills.

Men

Women

Team events

Tournaments

Achievements 
First World Cup career victory 

Men

Women
 Anna Odine Strøm (24), in her 10th season – the WC 8 in Ljubno
 Alexandria Loutitt (19), in her 3rd season – the WC 12 in Zaō

First World Cup podium 

Men
 Naoki Nakamura (26), in his 8th season – the WC 4 in Ruka – 3rd place
 Daniel Tschofenig (20), in his 3rd season – the WC 21 in Lake Placid – 3rd place

Women
 Alexandria Loutitt (19), in her 3rd season – the WC 12 in Zaō – 1st place
 Nozomi Maruyama (24), in her 6th season – the WC 17 in Willingen – 2nd place
 Frida Westman (21), in her 2nd season – the WC 2 in Wisła – 3rd place
 Selina Freitag (21), in her 5th season – the WC 9 in Ljubno – 3rd place
 Abigail Strate (21), in her 7th season – the WC 14 in Hinterzarten – 3rd place
 Nika Prevc (17), in her 2nd season – the WC 18 in Hinzenbach – 3rd place
 Julia Mühlbacher (18), in her 4th season – the WC 21 in Râșnov – 3rd place

Number of wins this season (in brackets are all-time wins) 

Men
 Halvor Egner Granerud – 12 (25)
 Dawid Kubacki – 6 (11)
 Stefan Kraft – 4 (29)
 Anže Lanišek – 4 (5)
 Ryōyū Kobayashi – 2 (29)
 Andreas Wellinger – 2 (5)

Women
 Katharina Althaus – 7 (15)
 Eva Pinkelnig – 6 (9)
 Silje Opseth – 4 (5)
 Anna Odine Strøm – 3 (3)
 Chiara Kreuzer – 2 (8)
 Yūki Itō – 1 (6)
 Ema Klinec – 1 (2)
 Alexandria Loutitt – 1 (1)

Retirements 
The following notable ski jumpers retired during or after the 2022–23 season:

Men
 Anders Fannemel
 Yumu Harada
 Stefan Hula
 Masamitsu Ito
 Filip Sakala
 Shohei Tochimoto 
Women
 Kinga Rajda
 Nika Vetrih

See also 
2022 FIS Ski Jumping Grand Prix
2022–23 FIS Ski Jumping Continental Cup
2022–23 FIS Cup (ski jumping)

Notes

References 

FIS Ski Jumping World Cup
World cup
World cup
Ski jumping